"Mountains" is a song written by Richie McDonald, Larry Boone and Paul Nelson, and recorded by American country music band Lonestar. It was released in June 2006 as the lead single from their seventh studio album of the same name. The song is the band's final Top Ten hit, reaching a peak of number 10 on the U.S. country singles charts in late 2006.

Content
"Mountains" is a mid-tempo in which the narrator cites two examples of people who overcome difficult situations in their lives. The first is a single mother who has to work two jobs to put her kids through school, and the second is an armed service veteran who sustained an injury in combat that required him to have a leg amputated, but runs a marathon wearing a prosthesis despite the pain he feels. In both situations, the narrator uses mountains as a metaphor for the struggles each person faces.

Music video
The music video was filmed partially west of Denver, Colorado (where the band played), and was directed by Kristin Barlowe.

Chart performance

Year-end charts

References

2006 singles
2006 songs
Lonestar songs
Songs written by Larry Boone
Songs written by Richie McDonald
Songs written by Paul Nelson (songwriter)
BNA Records singles
Song recordings produced by Mark Bright (record producer)
Country ballads
Songs about mountains